Cosmology is the academic discipline that seeks to understand the origin, evolution, structure, and ultimate fate of the universe.  The term is also often applied to the underlying model of such a system.

Cosmology may also refer to:

 Physical cosmology, the study of large-scale structures and dynamics of the universe
 Observational cosmology, the study of the structure, the evolution and the origin of the universe through observation
 Philosophical cosmology, a branch of philosophy that ponders the universe
 Religious cosmology,  a way of explaining the origin, history, and evolution of the universe based on religious traditions
 Biblical cosmology
 Buddhist cosmology
 Hindu cosmology
 Jain cosmology
 Cosmology (album), 2010 album by Rolo Tomasi
 Cosmology (textbook), 2008 book by Steven Weinberg
 Cosmology (The Urantia Book), cosmological and metaphysical concept outlined in The Urantia Book
 Cosmology@Home, BOINC volunteer computing project